Nakhchivan is an Autonomous Republic within the territory of Azerbaijan Republic. There are historical monuments, mausoleums, museums on the territory of Nakhchivan, many of which have become historical monuments.

The majority of Armenian monuments in Nakhchivan, including churches, monasteries and tombstones, were destroyed in the 20th and 21st century.

Chalcolithic monuments 
I Kultapa, Ovchular Tepesi, Sadarak, Khalac, Ərəbyеngicə and other monuments have been found during this period. More than 20 Chalcolithic monuments have been discovered during an archaeological expedition in the Sirab village of Babak region.

Duzdagh field 
The length of the Duzdagh salt field is 3 km, width is 2 km, and the thickness is 150 m. According to short-term studies of the French-Azerbaijani expedition in 2007, the discovery of Eneolit and Kur-Araz ceramics from the southern slopes of the deposit was supposed to start early in the operation of the mine. In order to obtain more comprehensive information, systematic investigations were launched in 2008.

6th-15th Centuries Monuments

16th-18th Centuries Monuments

19th Century Monuments

References 

Monuments and memorials by city